The 1935 World Fencing Championships were held in Lausanne, Switzerland.

Medal summary

Men's events

Women's events

References

World Fencing Championships
F
1935 in Swiss sport
Sports competitions in Lausanne
20th century in Lausanne